Wesley Goosen (born 20 October 1995) is a South African-born, New Zealand rugby union player who currently plays for Edinburgh Rugby in the United Rugby Championship.

Early career

Born in the South African city of East London, Goosen moved to New Zealand along with his family at the age of 4, initially settling in Auckland, where he attended primary school, before moving south to the nation's capital, Wellington where he attended high school at Wellington College.   After graduating from high school, he went on to play club rugby for Old Boys University while also being a member of 's Under-19 side which won the national title in 2014.

Senior career

In the 2015 ITM Cup, Goosen was a more regular player, scoring 2 tries in 9 matches. Goosen also played in the 2016 Mitre 10 Cup, scoring 4 tries in 11 games.

Super Rugby

The 20-year old scored with his first touch of the ball in the 14th minute, to help his side record a 29-14 win. He made one further substitute appearance that year.

Hurricanes head coach Chris Boyd promoted Goosen to the senior squad for the franchise's title defense in 2017.

International

Goosen was a New Zealand Schools representative in 2013, and scored a try in their 17-16 victory over Australia.   He was also a member of the New Zealand Under-20 side which competed in the Oceania Championship in Australia in May 2015; however he didn't make the final squad for the 2015 World Rugby Under 20 Championship in Italy.

Career Honours

Hurricanes

Super Rugby - 2016

Super Rugby Statistics

References

1995 births
Living people
New Zealand rugby union players
Rugby union centres
Rugby union wings
Wellington rugby union players
People educated at Wellington College (New Zealand)
South African emigrants to New Zealand
Hurricanes (rugby union) players
Rugby union fullbacks
Rugby union players from East London, Eastern Cape
Edinburgh Rugby players